Eugene "Gene" Martynec (born 28 March 1947) is a Canadian musician, composer and record producer.

Career
Martynec first came to prominence as a guitarist in Toronto group Bobby Kris & The Imperials in August 1965. He left the group in May 1967 to form Kensington Market with singer/songwriter Keith McKie, bass player Alex Darou, and drummer Jimmy Watson. He played acoustic guitar, bass and synthesizer on Lou Reed's 1973 album Berlin, along with providing the vocal arrangement on "The Bed". 

As a record producer, he won the Juno Award for Producer of the Year in 1981 for his work on Bruce Cockburn's "Tokyo" and Rough Trade's "High School Confidential". His work with Edward Bear for "Last Song" was also recognized with a Juno in 1973. Martynec also produced the top 40 single "Listen To The Radio" recorded by The Pukka Orchestra in 1984

Martynec has performed, composed or recorded with pop groups, pit orchestras, and created music for visual media and live theatre. He studied electronic music, composition and orchestration with Samuel Dolin at The Royal Conservatory of Music where he received two scholarships to study electronic music and composition (1970–1975).

He has been awarded Canada Council for the Arts and Toronto Arts Council grants for music composition. He taught signal processing, principals of digital audio, MIDI, studio production, synthesis, and studio orchestration at the Harris and Trebas institutes in Toronto.

His current interests are improvised new music, performing and composing live interactive electro-acoustic music using alternate controllers and interactive music software. Recently he has added a video component to his improvisational performances.

In late 1997, he released Silica, his first solo of composed and solo interactive electro-acoustic music. The Barcelona Duets was released in 2002. In 2004 he co-composed series of duets for a variety of instruments and interactive computer music called Toronto Duets which was funded by the Canada Council for the Arts. From 2000 to 2004 he curated Eugene's Sunday Series an exploration of new music and other art forms at Artword Theatre.

In 2004 Martynec moved to Beijing for two years where he performed in Yunnan Province with Yan Jun, a sound artist, music critic, poet and organizer and in Beijing at several music and art festivals such as the Dashanzi International Arts Festival and at the Bookworm Beijing, a venue for performance.

Based in London, England from 2007 through 2010 he performed with the London Improvisers Orchestra and many small ensembles including string trio Barrel and Triptec. He played with Amsterdam's Royal Improvisers Orchestra and Wuppertal Improvisers Orchestra in 2009 and 2010.

Back in Toronto in 2010, he organized the formation of the Toronto Improvisers Orchestra.

References

1947 births
Canadian composers
Canadian male composers
Canadian record producers
Canadian rock guitarists
Canadian male guitarists
Living people
The Royal Conservatory of Music alumni
Canadian keyboardists
Canadian expatriates in China
Canadian expatriates in the United Kingdom
Jack Richardson Producer of the Year Award winners